Blam! is the third album by the Los Angeles-based duo Brothers Johnson. Released in 1978, the album topped the Billboard R&B albums chart and reached number seven on the pop albums chart.

Track listing
"Ain't We Funkin' Now" - (Alex Weir, Louis Johnson, Quincy Jones, Tom Bahler, Valerie Johnson)  5:36
"So Won't You Stay" - (David Foster, Harvey Mason)  3:20
"Blam!" - (Alex Weir, David Foster, George Johnson, Louis Johnson, Quincy Jones, Tom Bahler)  4:55
"Rocket Countdown / Blastoff" - (William Reichenbach, Jerry Hey)  0:51 	
"Ride-O-Rocket" - (Nickolas Ashford, Valerie Simpson)   4:43
"Mista' Cool" - (Ed Eckstine, Larry Williams, Louis Johnson)  3:27
"It's You Girl" - (George Johnson, Louis Johnson, Quincy Jones)  3:32
"Streetwave" - (Alex Weir, Jerry Hey, Louis Johnson, Wayne Vaughn)  5:09

Personnel

 George Johnson – lead guitar, lead and backing vocals
 Louis Johnson – bass, guitar, piano, synthesizer, lead and backing vocals
 Alex Weir – rhythm guitar, backing vocals, lead vocals on "It's You Girl"
 David Foster – synthesizer, electric piano
 Larry Carlton  – guitar
 Steve Khan – guitar
 Harvey Mason – drums
 Steve Schaeffer – drums
 Wayne Vaughn – electric piano, backing vocals
 Richard Tee – electric piano, acoustic piano
 Eddie "Bongo" Brown – percussion
 Steve Porcaro – synthesizer
 Lawrence Williams – synthesizer, saxophone, flute, alto flute, clarinet
 Kim Hutchcroft – alto saxophone, soprano saxophone, baritone saxophone, tenor saxophone, alto flute
 Jerry Hey – trumpet, flugelhorn, piccolo trumpet, French horn
 Gary Grant – trumpet, flugelhorn, slide trumpet, piccolo trumpet
 William Reichenbach – bass alto trombone
 Michael Brecker – tenor saxophone
 Steve Foreman – timpani
 Babi Floyd – backing vocals
 Bobby Rodriquez – backing vocals
 Frank Floyd – backing vocals
 Gwen Guthrie – backing vocals
 Kenny Pickens – backing vocals
 Patti Austin – backing vocals
 Raymond Simpson – backing vocals
 Richard Heath – backing vocals
 Tom Bahler – backing vocals
 Yollanda McCullough – backing vocals
 Vivian Cherry – backing vocals
 William Eaton – backing vocals
 Zachary Sanders – backing vocals

Charts and certifications

Weekly charts

Year-end charts

Singles

Certifications

External links
 Brothers Johnson-Blam! at Discogs

References

1978 albums
The Brothers Johnson albums
A&M Records albums
Albums produced by Quincy Jones
Albums with cover art by Drew Struzan